Anthony Syiid McKegney  (born February 15, 1958) is a Canadian former professional ice hockey player who played 13 seasons in the National Hockey League from 1978–79 until 1990–91. He is the first black player in NHL history to score 40 goals in a season.

Career
McKegney was drafted 32nd overall by the Buffalo Sabres in the 1978 NHL Amateur Draft. On June 8, 1983, after five seasons with the Sabres, he was traded along with centers Andre Savard and J.F. Sauve to the Quebec Nordiques in exchange for winger Real Cloutier and Quebec's first-round draft pick in the 1983 draft.

McKegney was born in Montreal, but was adopted soon thereafter, and raised by a white family in Sarnia, Ontario. As a teenager he played Jr. 'B' hockey in Sarnia. He was following in the footsteps of his older brother Ian, who had been a star with the Sarnia Legionnaires before moving on to the pros. At age twenty, Tony McKegney signed a contract with the now defunct World Hockey Association’s (WHA) Birmingham Bulls, only to see the owner illegally renege on the deal after fans threatened to boycott the team for having added a black player to its roster. However, the WHA’s loss became the NHL’s gain, as McKegney would go on to score over 300 career goals, including 40 in the 1987-88 season. His total of 78 points in one season would remain the highest ever recorded by a black player until Jarome Iginla's breakout 2001-2002 campaign. He registered nine 20-goal seasons in a career that lasted over 900 games.

After finishing the 1990-91 season with the Chicago Blackhawks, McKegney would spend a season in Italy with HC Varese, as well as three games with the Canadian National Team. 

Terry Crisp, who was on the Canadian National Team coaching staff was named the head coach of the Tampa Bay Lightning for their inaugural season in 1992-93, raising McKegney's hopes that he could mount an NHL comeback with the club.  He felt that he could be a veteran leader for the expansion club, but he didn't crack the roster and instead played 23 games with the San Diego Gulls in 1992-93 before retiring.

McKegney currently does periodic work on behalf of the Red Wings Alumni Association and the Buffalo Sabres Alumni Hockey Team.

Achievements and awards
OMJHL First All-Star Team (1977)
OMJHL Second All-Star Team (1978)

Career statistics

Regular season and playoffs

International

References

External links
 

1958 births
Living people
Black Canadian ice hockey players
Buffalo Sabres draft picks
Buffalo Sabres players
Canadian adoptees
Canadian expatriate ice hockey players in Italy
Canadian ice hockey left wingers
Chicago Blackhawks players
Detroit Red Wings players
HC Varese players
Hershey Bears players
Kingston Canadians players
Ice hockey people from Montreal
Minnesota North Stars players
New York Rangers players
Quebec Nordiques players
San Diego Gulls (IHL) players
Sportspeople from Sarnia
St. Louis Blues players